The Central Missouri Jennies basketball team represents the University of Central Missouri in Warrensburg, Missouri, in the NCAA Division II women's basketball competition. The team is currently coached by Dave Slifer. The Jennies compete in the Mid-America Intercollegiate Athletics Association (MIAA). The team plays its home games in the Multipurpose Building on campus.

Season-by-season results

References

External links